Straight Ahead! is an album by jazz pianist Freddie Redd recorded in 1977 and released on the Interplay label.

Track listing 
All compositions by Freddie Redd, except where indicated
 "Straight Ahead" – 8:06
 "Play, Piano, Play" – 9:08
 "Waltzin' In" – 5:11
 "'Round Midnight (Thelonious Monk) – 8:04  
 "On Time" – 4:28
 "I'll Keep Loving You"  (Bud Powell) – 6:39

Personnel 
 Freddie Redd – piano 
 Henry Franklin – bass
 Carl Burnett – drums

References 

Freddie Redd albums
1978 albums
Interplay Records albums